Kimsar is a village, in Yamkeshwar Block of Pauri Garhwal district, Uttarakhand, India. 

One road to this place is through Rajaji National Park but now a new road is under construction which is supposed to be in use by September 2013.

As at the 2011 census, the village population was 365.

Tourism and yoga and meditation resorts are being developed by companies like Divine Destination Pvt Ltd.

References

Villages in Pauri Garhwal district